La gare de Virton (Virton Station) (formerly Virton - Saint-Mard) is a Belgian railway station on line 165, from Athus to Libramont, located in the city limits of Virton, near Saint-Mard in the province of Luxembourg, Walloon Region. It was commissioned in 1879 by the Society of Railway Virton. It is a station of the National Society of Belgian Railways (SNCB) served by trains: Omnibus (L) and Heure de pointe (Rush Hour) (P).

Railway station 
A hub station, it was the origin of the Invrabel line155, from Marbehan to Virton and the French border, which is partially closed and decommissioned and which has only the connection to the factory Burgo. The old railway station of Virton-Ville was on this line.

History 
In 1984, after the closure of steel plants of Athus and Longwy the passenger traffic between the stations of Virton and Athus was terminated.

The restoration and modernization of the station, at a cost of 170,000 euro, was finished in September 2006. The main renovations are to the passenger building, the marquee located on platform 1, and the parking. On Monday, December 11, 2006, the passenger service between Virton and Athus was renewed and to the city of Luxembourg.

Train services
The station is served by the following services:

Local services (L-13) Libramont - Virton - Athus - Arlon (weekdays)
Local services (L-13) Libramont - Virton (weekends)

Travellers' services

Hospitality 
A SNCB station. Virton station offers travelers a ticket office, open daily. Handicap facilities, equipment and services are available.

Serving 
Virton is served by trains, omnibuses (L) and Heure de pointe (Rush Hour) (P) of the SNCB undertaking service on line 165.

Transportation connections 
Parking for vehicles is available. Bus service is available.

References

External links 
 

Railway stations in Belgium
Railway stations in Luxembourg (Belgium)
Virton